Aeroflot Flight 601 was a scheduled Soviet domestic passenger flight from Arkhangelsk to Leshukonskoye, operated by Aeroflot. The Antonov An-24RV crashed on 24 December 1983 during approach to Leshukonskoye. Five out of forty-nine people on board survived the accident. Pilot error was cited as the cause of the accident.

Crew
The aircraft's crew consisted of captain Nikolai Alimov, first officer Alexander Priydak, navigating officer Vladimir Marichev, flight engineer Fyodor Igumnov and an unknown flight attendant.

Crash
The visibility at Leshukonskoye airport was 5 km, with drizzle and a wind speed of 3 m/s and air temperature 0°С. Sixteen kilometres away from Leshukonskoye airport and at an altitude of  the crew put the landing gear down and set the flaps at 15 degrees. Then the flaps were set to 38 degrees and the aircraft, piloted by captain, started to descend. The aircraft descended with a significant deviation that reached about 490 m to the left. The captain decided to land instead of making a go-around and banked the aircraft to the right. At an altitude of about  the captain decided to make a go-around. The landing gear was retracted and the aircraft started to climb, but reached critical slip angles which compromised aircraft control. The captain then ordered to set the flaps at 15 degrees, but by then the aircraft had stalled. It then started to descend with an increasing left bank angle. The left bank angle ultimately reached 90 degrees and the aircraft crashed 110 m right of the runway. The aircraft broke apart and partially burned. Four passengers and the flight attendant survived the accident.

The investigation placed the responsibility for the accident on the captain Alimov, who was found to have a risky style of piloting, which violated the flight instructions. It was also found that the crew should have initiated a go-around instead of attempting to land first. No fault with air traffic control was found.

References

External links
Accident description at the Aviation Safety Network

1983 in the Soviet Union
601
Airliner accidents and incidents caused by pilot error
Aviation accidents and incidents in 1983
Aviation accidents and incidents in the Soviet Union
Accidents and incidents involving the Antonov An-24
History of Arkhangelsk Oblast
December 1983 events in Europe